Juan Ignacio Londero and Luis David Martínez were the defending champions but only Londero chose to defend his title, partnering Tomás Lipovsek Puches. Londero lost in the semifinals to Leander Paes and Miguel Ángel Reyes-Varela.

Paes and Reyes-Varela won the title after defeating Ariel Behar and Roberto Quiroz 4–6, 6–3, [10–5] in the final.

Seeds

Draw

References
 Main Draw

Milex Open - Doubles
2018 Doubles